Gao Haiyan (born 26 March 1991) is a Chinese sailor who competed at the 2020 Summer Olympics.

References

External links
 
 
 

1991 births
Living people
Chinese female sailors (sport)
Olympic sailors of China
Sailors at the 2020 Summer Olympics – 470
Asian Games medalists in sailing
Asian Games silver medalists for China
Asian Games bronze medalists for China
Sailors at the 2018 Asian Games
Medalists at the 2018 Asian Games
21st-century Chinese women